The 1928 United States Senate election in Washington was held on November 6, 1928. Incumbent Democrat Clarence Dill was re-elected to a second term in office over Republican Chief justice Kenneth Mackintosh.

Democratic primary

Candidates 
Clarence C. Dill, incumbent Senator since 1923
James Cleveland Longstreet

Results

Republican primary

Candidates
Austin E. Griffiths
Kenneth Mackintosh, Chief Justice of the Washington Supreme Court since 1918
Miles Poindexter, U.S. Ambassador to Peru and former U.S. Senator (1911–23)

Results

General election

Results

See also 
 1928 United States Senate elections

References

1928
Washington
United States Senate